Xibaipo is a township-level division of Pingshan County, Shijiazhuang, Hebei, China. The Hebei Xibaipo, Xishan District of Hutuo River north of the small village, not only beautiful and fertile soil.
Once the Central Committee of the Chinese Communist Party, the Central Committee of the Chinese Communist Party and Chairman Mao have commanded the three major battles that shocked both China and the world, such as Liao, Huaihai and Ping and Tianjin, held the great historic significance of the second Plenary Session of the 7th CCP Central Committee and the national land conference, emancipated all China, and therefore had the reputation of "new China coming from here" and "the destiny of China to this village".As one of the revolutionary sites in China, it is a national key cultural relic protection unit and a national AAAAA level tourist attraction.

History
Xibaipo, a small mountain village on the North Bank of the Hutuo River in the west of Hebei Province, is considered beautiful. According to historical records, Xibaipo, originally known as "Bo bu", was first built in the Tang Dynasty, and was named after its luxuriant green cedar on the slope. In 1935, a teacher in the village changed "bu" to "Po" and changed his name to "Xibaipo village". He is located in the confluence of the North China Plain and Taihang Mountain, in a horseshoe like mountain depression in the sun, surrounded by three sides, surrounded by water, west of Taihang Mountain, east to the central Hebei Plain, only 90 kilometers from Shijiazhuang, North China. Traffic is convenient, easy to defend and difficult to attack. It is suitable for evacuated to the mountains in times of crisis. In terms of economic conditions, the village of Xibaipo village is dense, with a distance of 1-2 kilometers, and along the Hutuo River. Marshal Nie Rongzhen once said: "Pingshan County can be called Ukraine in the Jin Cha Ji border area." The more developed agricultural economy is conducive to ensuring the economic supply of the army and the people and providing the material base for the CCP Central Committee's resident.

Xibaipo was selected as the command center for the liberation of China and the preparation of new China. It not only has its unique geographical conditions and natural environment, but also has the revolutionary base and political advantage established for many years. In Pingshan County, the revolution was started earlier, and the Communist Party was established in the period of the great revolution. By 1946, the Party branch of the county was 608, the Communist Party members developed from 60 in 1931 to 19535, and the masses listened to the party, and the mass foundation was better. Since the war of resistance against Japan, Pingshan County has been surrounded by the two major bases of Shanxi, Hebei, Hebei, Shandong and Henan border areas.

Pingshan County is the location of the Fourth Army division of the Jin Cha Ji border area and the leading organ of the Second Army division. The northern branch of the Central Committee of the Chinese Communist Party, the government of the Jin Cha Ji border area and the Jin Cha Ji military district have also lived here for more than three and a half years. Pingshan County is a model county in the Jin Cha Ji border area. Xibaipo is a model village. Xibaipo built its party in winter in 1937. By 1948, there were 40 party members, distributed in 33 households, accounting for 12.3% of the total number of villages, accounting for 33% of the total number of households in the village.

Xibaipo was effectively the capital of the North China Communist Border Region for a period before the communists took Beijing at the end of the Pingjin Campaign on 31 January 1949.

Geography
Xibaipo town is located at the foot of Taihang Shandong, with a total area of 55 thousand mu and a forest area of 27 thousand mu. The area has the largest inland water surface in North China, with an area of 7000 mu. The area is located in the warm temperate zone. It is a semi arid continental monsoon climate. The four seasons are clear, cold and dry in winter, hot and rainy in summer, and the annual average temperature is 12.5 degrees Celsius. The superior geographical position, the developed economy, the solid foundation of the mass and the distribution of the appropriate villages have made the Xibaipo the best choice for the Central Committee of the Industrial Committee.

Present Situation
When Huang general visited Xibaipo in 1988, he wrote the inscription "new China is coming from here". Xibaipo has a glorious history. Xibaipo people have made great contributions in different historical periods. In 1958, for the construction of the Gangan reservoir, the people of Xibaipo moved from rich rice grain Sichuan to Gao Gang drought ridge. The per capita cultivated land area changed from 5 mu to 0.3 mu. The production and living conditions were extremely bad, especially in 1998, after the Gangnan Reservoir was designated as the drinking water source of the provincial capital, the aquaculture, industrial and mining enterprises of xiabe were banned. In order to protect water resources and protect the ecological environment, the mountain area prohibits grazing and develops red tourism.

Traffic
Xibaipo is located in the middle of Pingshan County, 45 kilometers from Pingshan County, 85 kilometers from Shijiazhuang provincial capital, 79 kilometers from the entrance of Jingshi high speed Shijiazhuang, 207 National Road across the whole border. All 16 administrative villages are scattered on both sides of the National Road, the road is smooth and the traffic is convenient.

The newly built Xibaipo expressway can be directly accessible from Shijiazhuang.

Tourism
Xibaipo memorial is located in the center of the town. With the development of tourism, there are 500 thousand people visiting here every year.

Xibaipo, 30 kilometers from the North Guilin, is 90 kilometers from the Buddhist holy land Mount Wutai. It is 70 kilometers from the camel beam of the summer resort. It is 35 kilometers from the ancient capital of Zhongshan and 40 kilometers from the Pai Hotsprings Spa Resort. It is a transit station for the tourist attractions. With the rapid development of the tourism industry, the town Party committee and government have built Xibaipo Forest Park, planting 1 million 800 thousand landscaping, ornamental and all kinds of economic trees. And in the park to increase the examination, return, Keyuan, twelve zodiac gardens and other attractions 24. In the scenic area, the air is fresh, the birds are chirping, the Po Po Lake is blue waves, and the fans are small. It is a good place for fishing, boating and holidays. At the same time, the peony garden of Xibaipo, which covers an area of 300 mu, has more than 110 varieties and more than 30000 peonies, is held every year from 4 to May, and the peony festival is held.

The Xibaipo memorial hall is the memorial site of the former site of the Chinese revolution. In Pingshan County, Hebei Province, Xibaipo is the location of the Central Committee of the Chinese Communist Party in the late liberation war and the headquarters of the Chinese People's Liberation Army. It is the last rural command post of the liberation of China. In 1958, a reservoir and a revolutionary site were relocated. Since 1970, the site of the Central Committee of the Chinese Communist Party has been restored and restored to a total area of 16440 square meters. In 1977, the new Xibaipo memorial hall was built with an area of 3344 square meters. On May 26, 1978, the site and Memorial Hall of the CCP Central Committee were open at the same time.

The museum has more original collections and more than 2000 pieces of revolutionary relics, of which 15 are 8 categories. Basically, there are exhibitions of revolutionary sites and auxiliary displays of memorial hall. The restoration of the old residence of Mao Zedong, Zhu De, Liu Shaoji, Zhou Enlai, Ren Bishi, Dong Biwu, the second Plenary Session of the 7th CCP Central Committee meeting site of the Chinese Communist Party, the meeting site of the Central Committee of the Chinese Communist Party in September, the headquarters of the Chinese people's Liberation Army, the Central Committee of the Chinese Communist Party to meet the old site of the Kuomintang peace representative, etc. The Memorial Hall's auxiliary display, through cultural relics, literature, pictures and information, systematically reflects the revolutionary practice of the Central Committee of the Chinese Communist Party and the leaders in Xibaipo.

Local customs and practices. Xibaipo folk customs are simple, and the culture is deep. Lantau Peak, Tiger Hill, Tang TA, general slope, mother ridge, donkey mountain and so on all have beautiful and moving legends. Xibaipo outstanding people, the central ministries and commissions worked here and fought, is the cradle of the birth of new China.

Specialty
Xibaipo is rich in persimmon, black jujube, high quality thin skin walnut, Chinese great apricot, sour jujube and other dry fruit, pepper, beans, peanuts, millet, sorghum and other small cereals. In addition, farmers have scattered eggs, with good taste and high nutritional value. It is also popular with tourists.
Culture and education

Culture and education
Xibaipo education ranks among the top of the county, with one secondary school and three primary schools, with a student enrollment rate of 100%,  and there is a health center in the Township Center, with a health center in the village, which basically meets the needs of patients. Xibaipo cultural station is one of the pilot cultural stations in Hebei Province, with a building area of 1100 square meters. The cultural station is equipped with a library, a computer room, a multi-functional classroom and a fitness and musical instrument. The functions are complete and the conditions are superior, which meet the growing cultural needs of the people.

See also
List of township-level divisions of Hebei

References

Township-level divisions of Hebei
Pingshan County, Hebei